The  was a Japanese resistance organization in China during the Second Sino-Japanese War. It was disbanded by the nationalist government for fear that it had communist sympathies.

See also
Teru Hasegawa
League to Raise the Political Consciousness of Japanese Troops

References

Second Sino-Japanese War
Japanese Resistance
Japanese anti-war activists
World War II resistance movements